Al-Qaṭrāneh is one of the districts  of Karak governorate, Jordan.

See also
Qatraneh town
Qatrana Power Plant
Qasr al-Qatraneh, fortified khan (inn) along the hajj route

References

 
Districts of Jordan